"Hot Stuff (Let's Dance)" is a song by British singer Craig David. It written by David and Fraser T. Smith for his fourth studio album Trust Me (2007), with production overseen by Smith. The song samples David Bowie's 1983 number-one single "Let's Dance". Due to the inclusion of the sample, Bowie is also credited as a songwriter. "Hot Stuff (Let's Dance)" was released in November 2007 as the second single from Trust Me, following the single "This Is the Girl" with rapper Kano. It became a top ten hit in Croatia, Denmark, Finland, Hungary, Sweden, and the Unitd Kingdom, while reaching the top 40 on the majority of all other charts it appeared on.

Chart performance
"Hot Stuff (Let's Dance)" debuted at number 19 in the UK Singles Chart. In its second week on the charts, it moved up to number 7. The song also broke into the Swedish Singles Chart, and peaked at number 10.

Music video
A music video for "Hot Stuff (Let's Dance)" was directed by Justin Francis.

Track listing

Notes
  signifies an additional producer

Charts

Weekly charts

Year-end charts

References

2007 singles
Craig David songs
Songs written by David Bowie
Songs written by Craig David
Songs written by Fraser T. Smith
2007 songs
Sire Records singles
Warner Records singles